Eupsophus emiliopugini is a species of frog in the family Alsodidae. It is found in the temperate Nothofagus forests of Chile between 40°50'S and 45°20'S, and in the Lago Puelo National Park, Chubut Province, Argentina. The specific name emiliopugini honors Professor Emilio Pugín, for "his contribution to knowledge of the reproductive biology and development of the Chilean frogs". Common name Emilio's ground frog has been coined for the species.

Description
Adult males measure  and females  in snout–vent length. Newly metamorphosed froglets measure .

The head is wider than it is long. The tympanum is distinct, and there is a well-developed supra-tympanic fold. The limbs are slender. Webbing is absent. Skin is smooth. The dorsal ground color is grayish brown to leaden. There is a lemon-yellow vertebral line and an olive-green band between the eyes. Sometimes there are bright yellowish reticulations on the thighs. The belly is whitish; mature males have bright orange gular area.

Habitat and conservation
Adults can be found under logs or in small holes at the edges of streams. Males call from small holes at day. Females lay their eggs inside the holes; the free-swimming tadpoles develop in these water-filled cavities on the ground.

It is threatened by habitat loss caused by fires and plantation of exotic trees for forestry. It occurs in the Lago Puelo National Park in Argentina.

References

emiliopugini
Amphibians of Patagonia
Amphibians of Argentina
Amphibians of Chile
Amphibians described in 1989
Taxonomy articles created by Polbot